Al-Yasiri is a surname. Notable people with the surname include:
 Aziz Al-Yasiri (1945–2007), Iraqi politician 
 Isa Hasan al-Yasiri (born 1942), Iraqi-Canadian poet
 Qays Abd al-Hussein al-Yasiri (1941–2019), Iraqi media historian 
 Rafif al-Yasiri (1985–2018), Iraqi plastic surgeon and TV host doctor, writer, media personality
 Tawfiq al-Yasiri (died 2020), Iraqi military officer and politician

Arabic-language surnames